Ye Weiqu (6 August 1929 – 11 December 2010) was a Chinese Vietnamese translator and scholar. Ye was a visiting professor at Waseda University, Gakushuin University and Ritsumeikan University.

He was among the first few in China who translated the works of Yasunari Kawabata's into Chinese language.

Biography
Ye was a Chinese Vietnamese born on Cholon, French Indo-China on August 6, 1929, with his ancestral home in Dongguan, Guangdong.

In 1952, Ye went to Beijing from Hong Kong, he graduated from Peking University, majoring in Japanese at the Department of East Language and Literature.
After graduation, he was assigned an editor to the People's Literature Publishing House and Chinese Academy of Social Sciences.

In 1966, the Cultural Revolution was launched by Mao Zedong, Ye and his wife Tang Yuemei's whole collection of books was burned by the Red Guards, the couple were sent to the May Seventh Cadre Schools to work in Henan.

In 1976, Hua Guofeng and Ye Jianying toppled the Gang of Four, the couple were rehabilitated by Deng Xiaoping, at the same time, they started to study Japanese literature.

Ye died of heart disease at Chuiyangliu Hospital, in Beijing, on December 11, 2010.

Works
 The History of Japanese Culture
 The History of Japanese Literature

 Mono no aware and Tacit consciousness: Japanese Aesthetical Sense
 The Biography of Kawabata Yasunari
 The Biography of Jun'ichirō Tanizaki
 Kanikosen (Takiji Kobayashi)
 Snow Country (Yasunari Kawabata)
 Thousand Cranes (Yasunari Kawabata)
 The Dancing Girl of Izu (Yasunari Kawabata)

Awards
 Chinese Translation Association – Competent Translator (2004)

Personal life
In 1956, Ye married his middle school sweetheart Tang Yuemei, also a translator, in Beijing.

References

1929 births
2010 deaths
People from Ho Chi Minh City
Peking University alumni
People's Republic of China translators
Japanese–Chinese translators
Hoa people
Vietnamese emigrants to China
20th-century Chinese translators
21st-century Chinese translators